Juan Miguel Echevarría Laflé (born 11 August 1998) is a Cuban athlete specialising in the long jump. He represented his country at the 2017 World Championships, narrowly missing the final.

His personal bests in the event are  outdoors in Bad Langensalza in 2018 with a wind of + and  indoors in Birmingham in 2018. While this jump was not eligible for the Cuban record due to the excessive wind assistance, it was notable for being the longest jump in competition under any conditions for nearly 24 years, and the fourth longest jump under any conditions ever.

International competitions

References

External links

1998 births
Living people
Cuban male long jumpers
World Athletics Championships athletes for Cuba
Athletes (track and field) at the 2019 Pan American Games
Pan American Games gold medalists for Cuba
Pan American Games medalists in athletics (track and field)
World Athletics Championships medalists
Sportspeople from Camagüey
World Athletics Indoor Championships winners
Diamond League winners
Pan American Games gold medalists in athletics (track and field)
Medalists at the 2019 Pan American Games
Athletes (track and field) at the 2020 Summer Olympics
Medalists at the 2020 Summer Olympics
Olympic silver medalists in athletics (track and field)
Olympic silver medalists for Cuba
Olympic athletes of Cuba
21st-century Cuban people